Acleros is an Afrotropical genus of skippers.

Species
Acleros bibundica Strand, 1913
Acleros leucopyga (Mabille, 1877)
Acleros mackenii (Trimen, 1868)
Acleros neavei Evans, 1937
Acleros nigrapex Strand, 1913
Acleros ploetzi Mabille, 1889
Acleros sparsum Druce, 1909

Acleros bala described by Berger from Ghana is a manuscript name.

References
Natural History Museum Lepidoptera genus database

External links
Acleros at funet
Seitz, A. Die Gross-Schmetterlinge der Erde 13: Die Afrikanischen Tagfalter. Plate XIII 77

Erionotini
Hesperiidae genera